The University of Kamina (UNIKAM) is a public university in the Democratic Republic of the Congo, located in the province of Katanga, city of Kamina. At its creation, it was an Extension of the University of Lubumbashi, then called University Centre of Kamina (C.U.K.). Instruction is in French.

History
The University was created 1 October 2004 as Kamina Center University(C.U.C.K.), extension of the  University of Lubumbashi, and became autonomous in 2010 following Ministerial order No. 157/MINESU/CABMIN/EBK/PK/2010 27 September 2010.

References
 Ministerial Decree No. 157/MINESU/CABMIN/EBK-PK-2010 September 27, 2010, on the empowerment of some extensions of the institutions of higher and university education (article 2 point 8)

See also
 Kamina
 Katanga Province

Universities in the Democratic Republic of the Congo
Kamina
Educational institutions established in 2004
2004 establishments in the Democratic Republic of the Congo